Toot Hill or Toothill may refer to:

Places

England
 Toot Hill, Essex, a village
 Toothill, Wiltshire, a settlement near Freshbrook, Swindon, Wiltshire
 Toothill, West Yorkshire, a settlement in West Yorkshire; see List of United Kingdom locations: To-Tq
 Toot Hill, Staffordshire, a settlement in Staffordshire; see List of United Kingdom locations: To-Tq
 Toot Hill ridge, Nottinghamshire; see Bingham Wapentake
 Toot Hill School, a school in Bingham, Nottinghamshire
 Toothill, Hampshire, a settlement in Hampshire; see List of United Kingdom locations: To-Tq
 Toothill Fort, or Toothill Ring, or Toothill camp, the site of an Iron Age univallate hillfort in Hampshire

People
 John Toothill (1866–1947), English rugby union footballer

See also
 Todt Hill, Staten Island, New York, US
 Tootle, a children's book
 Tothill, a hamlet in Lincolnshire, England
 Tuthill (disambiguation)